Leonard Glasser is a painter and sculptor, screenwriter, cartoonist and animator.

Glasser designed Ernie Pintoff's The Interview and The Old Man And The Flower. He cited André François and Saul Steinberg as inspirations.

He was the screenwriter for Mojave Moon and Out Cold and the animator for the 1971 film The Telephone Book.

Glasser attended the Philadelphia Museum School of Art 1953–1956. His production company was called "Stars and Stripes Forever Productions."

Film credits
Mojave Moon (1996) – Screenplay
Out Cold (1989) – Screenplay adaption of existing story
The Telephone Book (1971) – Animator
No Second Chances – Director

References

External links

Living people
American film directors
American animated film directors
American animators
American male screenwriters
1935 births